Joni Luann Huntley (born August 4, 1956) is an American high jumper. She competed at the 1976 and 1984 Olympics and won a bronze medal in 1984, placing fifth in 1976. At the Pan American Games she won a gold medal in 1975 and a bronze in 1983. She was ranked as third-best high jumper in the world in 1975. Domestically she won the national title in 1974–77 and set four American records in 1974–75.

Prep
Huntley was born in McMinnville, Oregon, and raised in Sheridan, Oregon, where she attended Sheridan High School.  While there she was the first high school girl over 6 feet, setting the NFHS national high school record.

College
Huntley is a graduate of Oregon State University graduate school and Long Beach State undergraduate. Huntley set an OSU high jump record of 6 feet 2 3/4 inches, which still stands. Huntley graduated from Long Beach State in California to work with 1988 Summer Olympics assistant coach Dave Rodda.

Professional
Huntley served as an assistant track and field coach at Oregon State Beavers starting in 1981 when she started her masters of education program at Oregon State University College of Education.

Huntley spent her professional career as a kindergarten teacher in the Portland Public Schools and as a coach, including leading workshops for young athletes and coaching for the Portland Track Club.

Personal
Huntley is a retired teacher at Forest Park Elementary and she lives in the in Portland Metro area and has two daughters.

References

External links
 
 
 
 
 Joni Huntley (1956–) By Christine Chute Oregon Encyclopedia

Living people
1956 births
American female high jumpers
Olympic bronze medalists for the United States in track and field
Athletes (track and field) at the 1975 Pan American Games
Athletes (track and field) at the 1976 Summer Olympics
Athletes (track and field) at the 1983 Pan American Games
Athletes (track and field) at the 1984 Summer Olympics
Oregon State University alumni
Track and field athletes from Oregon
Medalists at the 1984 Summer Olympics
Pan American Games gold medalists for the United States
Pan American Games bronze medalists for the United States
Pan American Games medalists in athletics (track and field)
Medalists at the 1975 Pan American Games
Medalists at the 1983 Pan American Games
21st-century American women